is an action-adventure video game developed by Konami for the PlayStation 2 (PS2) home game console. It was released in Japan on December 21, 2000 and in PAL regions on September 28, 2001.

Plot 
7 Blades is based on the 1990 film Zipang, directed by Japanese filmmaker Kaizo Hayashi. The game takes place in mid-17th century Japan, during which the Tokugawa shogunate was gaining power. The game is set on the man-made island Dejima, which the Japanese government is using to house Western foreigners and where a Christian group is trying to separate from the rest of the country. The main character is Gokurakumaru, a violent mercenary and poor womanizer. He travels with his gun-wielding love interest (Oyuri) and sidekick (Togizo). The latter provides comic relief and holds the swords as Gokurakumaru collects them one by one.

Development 
7 Blades was developed by Konami Computer Entertainment Japan East (KCEJ East) in association with Paradise Pictures. The game was in development for over two years with a staff of around 20 people. Konami was assisted by Hayashi, who served as the game's directing supervisor and was given creative control over its storyline, dialogue, and action. Hayashi had not been involved in video games prior to 7 Blades, but began leaning towards production of such a game when visual advances in computer graphics were made in the medium, striving to make it "universally appealing". Hayashi meant for 7 Blades to cover a wide range of genres, and that even with the player killing a large number of enemies, hoped that it could be enjoyed as a sophisticated sword-fighting game as well. Hayashi felt that meshing the story branches of the two playable characters was a feature "only possible in a game". Both Hayashi and producer Atsushi Horigami understood the importance of gameplay and insisted on making "a movie with some very deep action gameplay elements".

7 Blades was first announced by Konami in May 2000, just before the Electronic Entertainment Expo (E3). Konami released the first screenshots of the game in July of that year and made the game available to play at the Tokyo Game Show in September. The game was released in Japan on December 21, 2000 alongside the 7 Blades Original Soundtrack produced by the Meyna Company and the single for the opening theme "Love Will See Us Though" by Sayaka Kubo. A novelization of the game titled  by Ryosuke Sakaki was published by Dengeki Media Works in February 2002.

Reception 

7 Blades was met with a lukewarm critical response from European and Australian publications, currently holding an aggregate score of 64.5% on GameRankings.

The game was re-released under the "Konami the Best" range of budget titles in Japan, as well as its collection of European budget titles.

References

External links 
7 Blades at GameFAQs

2000 video games
Action-adventure games
Hack and slash games
Konami games
Video games about ninja
PlayStation 2 games
PlayStation 2-only games
Video games about samurai
Video games set in feudal Japan
Video games developed in Japan